Plea for Peace may refer to:

 Plea for Peace Foundation, a non-profit organization based in California
 Plea for Peace (EP), an EP by Operation Ivy